Mad for Sadness is a live album by Scottish indie rock band Arab Strap, released on 3 May 1999 by Go! Beat.

Track listing

Charts

References

External links
 Official Arab Strap discography

Arab Strap (band) albums
1999 live albums
Chemikal Underground live albums